"PonPonPon" (stylized as PONPONPON) is a song and debut single by Japanese singer Kyary Pamyu Pamyu. It was released as the lead single for her EP, Moshi Moshi Harajuku, and later included on her debut album, Pamyu Pamyu Revolution. The song was written and produced by Yasutaka Nakata of Capsule. The music video, a psychedelic tribute to Kawaii and Decora culture, was released to YouTube on July 16, 2011, and became a viral hit. On 27 July 2012, a limited edition of a 7' LP with Side A: PONPONPON -extended mix- and Side B: Cherry Bon Bon -extended mix- was released (and re-released on 3 January 2013) exclusively for DJs.

The song was launched on iTunes internationally in 23 countries, and set records for a Japanese song, reaching #1 in Finland and #4 in Belgium. As of 2012, the song sold over 1million digital downloads. As of 2016, the music video has over 100million views on YouTube. Internationally, the song has been featured in G-Eazy's single "Lost in Translation", FACE's "Night Fever", and was featured in The Simpsons episode "Married to the Blob". PonPonPon is featured on the 2012 Japan game, Just Dance Wii 2.

The Japan Times in 2019 listed "PonPonPon" among the most influential J-Pop songs of the 2010s decade, noting the music video's extravagant aesthetics and electronic production.

Music video

Development
The music video for "PonPonPon" was shot by Jun Tamukai. The theme of the music video is "kawaii", which means cute in Japanese. Tamukai regarded Kyary as a person bending the definition of "kawaii" by mixing it with weirdness. The art director Sebastian Masuda, of fashion brand 6%DOKIDOKI, adopted the randomness of "a room of a girl who isn't good at tidying up", adding "a taste of the 60-70s". The fashion stylist and designer for the video was Kumiko Iijima.

Synopsis
The video is a mix of 2D and 3D animation. It depicts two worlds, the first of which was created by Masuda Sebastian and looks like a room of a girl; the other is her own mental world, where her face is pink-colored. The video starts with a microphone stand coming out of Kyary's ear. The microphone stand is used to imitate the image of Freddie Mercury.

In the chorus, Kyary performs a dance choreographed by air:man with the lyrics inserted as kinetic typography. When Kyary claps during the bridge, slices of bread appear because "pan" is the Japanese onomatopoeia for the sound of a clap, as well as the word for bread.

A combo television unit into which a cassette is inserted is a reference to the fact that analog broadcasting stopped in Japan and was switched to digital broadcasting on July 20, the same day the song was released on iTunes Store.
Kyary parodies the "Hige dance" from the 70s comedy show 8 Ji Dayo! Zenin Shugo wearing a mustache and does the "kamehameha" move from the Japanese manga series Dragon Ball.

Personnel
Credits adapted from liner notes.

Cover artwork
Steve Nakamura – art director, designer
Shinji Konishi – hair, make-up
Eri Soyama – stylist

Charts

Certifications

References

External links
 - uploaded on 16 July 2011.

2011 singles
Songs written by Yasutaka Nakata
Kyary Pamyu Pamyu songs
Internet memes
Song recordings produced by Yasutaka Nakata
Warner Music Japan singles
Electropop songs
Dance-pop songs
Japanese songs
J-pop songs